María Teresa López Beltrán (13 June 1950 – 11 March 2012) was a Spanish historian and medievalist, a professor at the University of Málaga.

Biography
Born in Tétouan on 13 June 1950, her family soon moved to Santa Cruz de Tenerife. There she earned a licentiate in geography and history at the University of La Laguna, publishing her thesis Régimen jurídico de los molinos en el Valle del Ebro (Jurisdiction of the Mills in the Ebro Valley). In 1973 she began working at the University of Granada, where she was an assistant professor of legal history for three academic years, and started a thesis on poverty in legal regulations in modern Spain, which she never completed.

In 1976 she arrived at the University of Málaga (UMA), being hired for a year as an assistant professor of the Department of Ancient History, and in 1978 she joined the Medieval Department, publishing her thesis El puerto de Málaga en la transición a los tiempos modernos (The Port of Málaga in the Transition to Modern Times). She received her title as an associate professor in 1988. In her 35 years as a professor and researcher, she was considered one of the most knowledgeable academics on women and sexuality in the Middle Ages, as evidenced by her best-known work, La prostitución en el reino de Granada en época de los Reyes Católicos (Prostitution in the Kingdom of Granada in the Time of the Catholic Monarchs).

A noted authority on medieval women, she published several articles on childhood, education, employment, sexuality, and the repopulation of the Kingdom of Granada, which led to changes in the field and a new vision of women's work in late medieval cities. She was a founding member and a director of the UMA's Association of Women's Studies, established in 1985. In addition, she taught courses in Zaragoza, Jaén, Cádiz, and Argentina.

Her studies were not only based on the fields of women and sexuality; she also explored the areas of the New Christians and of commerce. Through her research, she found a document in the Biblioteca Nacional de España that spoke about the mythical country of Cockaigne. This was the first known mention of that country in Spain.

María Teresa López Beltrán died suddenly on 11 March 2012, while working on a book titled Judeoconversos y reconciliados en Málaga y su obispado a finales de la Edad Media (Jewish Converts and Reconciled in Málaga and its Bishopric in the Late Middle Ages).

Selected publications

References

External links
 María Teresa López Beltrán at Dialnet 
 Historia(s) de Mujeres, posthumous tribute at the University of Málaga 

1950 births
2012 deaths
20th-century Spanish historians
People from Tétouan
Spanish medievalists
University of Granada alumni
Academic staff of the University of Granada
Women medievalists
Academic staff of the University of Málaga